Cornelis Compter (16 July 1894 – 23 February 1945) was a Dutch weightlifter. He competed in the men's featherweight event at the 1928 Summer Olympics. He was killed in the Mauthausen-Gusen Concentration Camp during World War II.

See also
 List of Mauthausen-Gusen inmates

References

1894 births
1945 deaths
Dutch male weightlifters
Olympic weightlifters of the Netherlands
Weightlifters at the 1928 Summer Olympics
Sportspeople from The Hague
People who died in Mauthausen concentration camp
Dutch people who died in Nazi concentration camps
20th-century Dutch people